The vicuña is a camelid native to South America.

Vicuña may also refer to:

Geography
Vicuña, Chile, Chilean commune and city
Vicuña, Álava, village in the Basque Country, Spain
La Vicuña, village in Argentina
Vicuña Mackenna, Argentina, town in Argentina
Sierra Vicuña Mackenna, mountain range in Chile

People
Benjamín Vicuña (born 1978), Chilean actor
Benjamín Vicuña Mackenna (1831–1886), Chilean writer, journalist, historian and politician
Cecilia Vicuña (born 1948), Chilean poet and artist
Eladio Vicuña Aránguiz (1911–2008), Chilean Roman Catholic prelate
Francisco Ramón Vicuña (1775–1849), Chilean politician
Joaquín Vicuña (1786–1857), Chilean politician
Laura Vicuña (1891–1904), Chilean child saint
Pedro Félix Vicuña (1805–1874), Chilean journalist
Soledad Fariña Vicuña (born 1943), Chilean poet
Vincentia Maria López y Vicuña (1847–1896), Spanish Roman Catholic saint